Førde Fjord is a fjord in Vestland county, Norway.  It is the longest of all the fjords in the traditional district of Sunnfjord. Førdefjorden passes through the municipalities of Sunnfjord, Askvoll, and Kinn. The fjord begins at the town of Førde, at the estuary of the river Jølstra, which comes from the lake Jølstravatn. The island of Svanøya lies just outside the mouth of Førdefjorden.  There are roads along the shoreline on both the north and south sides of the fjord, and the European route E39 highway runs past the town of Førde, near Førdefjorden.

Development of mining industry
Nordic Mining have applied to deposit 6m tonnes of tailings a year for 50 years into the Fjord, prompting much opposition. In May 2022, a permission was granted; however, an operations plan [has not yet been approved] by Directorate of Mining (as of Q2 2022).

[As of 2021] Nordic Mining is permitted to dump 9 [metric] tons of chemicals into the fjord per year, including 2 tons of SIBX (sodium isobutyl xanthate).

Settlements
The following settlements are located along the Førdefjorden:
Stavang (in Flora municipality), on the north side, at the mouth of the fjord
Kvammen (in Askvoll municipality), on the south side, near the mouth of the fjord
Indrevevring (in Naustdal municipality), on the north side, a little ways into the fjord
Helle (in Naustdal municipality), on the north side, about the middle of the fjord
Naustdal (the administrative centre of Naustdal municipality), on the north side, near the inner part of the fjord
Førde (the adm. centre of Førde municipality), at the innermost part of the fjord

Media gallery

See also
 List of Norwegian fjords

References

Fjords of Vestland
Sunnfjord
Askvoll
Kinn